Forest Hill Park may refer to:

 Forest Hill Park (Ohio) in East Cleveland and Cleveland Heights, Ohio, listed on the National Register of Historic Places in Cuyahoga County, Ohio
 Forest Hill Park (Richmond, Virginia), listed on the National Register of Historic Places in Richmond, Virginia

See also
 Forest Hill (disambiguation)